Sakaziro Demk of Ngardmau state is a high chief beouch and one of the many chiefs of Palau.  High chief beouch is the position of highest political and social leadership in a village, and is held by a son of the oldest queen or princess of Ngedngoll, the highest clan of Ngardmau. In Palau, all 16 states have traditional chiefs and queens, presidents, and governors.

References

External links
Official Ngardmau Website
Seacology Ngardmau State Project Seacology
 Chief of State and Cabinet Members
 Official Site of the Republic of Palau
UNESCO site
Conservation Society of Pohnpei

Palauan culture